Bernarda Brunović (born 11 November 1993), known mononymously as Bernarda and previously by the stage name Bernarda Bruno, is a Swiss-Croatian singer and songwriter.

Career
In late 2010 Brunović was chosen as one of the participants of Die grosse Entscheidungs Show, the Swiss nation final to choose the country's entry for the Eurovision Song Contest 2011. On 11 December 2010, she performed the song "Confidence" and ended up as the runner up with a total of 13.36% votes received. Throughout 2014 and 2017 Brunović released three singles for the Croatian market, "Olujna noć", "Gdje da nađem mir" and "Ti i ja", respectively. In 2018, Brunović took part in the eighth season of The Voice of Germany. She was eliminated in the semi-final. On 17 January 2019, Brunović was announced as one of the 16 participants in Dora 2019, the national contest in Croatia to select the country's Eurovision Song Contest 2019 entry, with the song "I Believe in True Love". She finished the competition as 6th with a total of nine points. Two years later, on 15 December 2020, she was announced as one of the competitors at Dora 2021. On 13 February 2021 she performed the song "Colors", penned by herself and Borislav Milanov. She finished in 7th place with 99 points, 77 from the Juries (2nd place) and 22 points from the public (10th place). The following year, on 17 December 2021, she was announced as one of the acts to perform at Dora 2022 with the song "Here for Love". On 19 February 2022, she performed at Dora 2022 and finished in 4th place, with 111 points.

Discography

Singles
"Confidence" (2011)
"Olujna noć" (2014)
"Gdje da nađem mir" (2016)
"Ti i ja" (2017)
"I Believe in True Love" (2019)
"Nebo" (2020)
"Colors" (2021)
"Here for Love" (2022)

References

Living people
1993 births
21st-century Swiss women singers
21st-century Croatian women singers
Swiss singer-songwriters
Swiss people of Croatian descent
The Voice of Germany
Blind musicians
Swiss blind people